Craig Boreham is an Australian film director, producer, and writer.

Career

To date, Boreham has focussed his attention on short film works that explore issues of marginalised sexuality and the politics of desire. Craig Boreham graduated from both the University of Technology Sydney (UTS) and the Australian Film Television and Radio School (AFTRS), and his films have screened extensively throughout the world and collected a number of awards including The City of Melbourne Best Queer Short Film Award, Melbourne Queer Film Festival, and Best Independent Film, Newtown Flicks Short Film Festival, Sydney.

In 2005 his short drama Transient, premiered at the Berlin International Film Festival in 2005 and received a Teddy Award nomination for best short film.

In 2008, LesGaiCineMad and Fundación Triángulo in Madrid, programmed a retrospective of Boreham's short films titled True Cinema Poison.

Boreham's film Drowning had its Australian premiere at the Academy Award accredited film competition Flickerfest International Short Film Festival at Bondi Beach Sydney. Drowning starred up and coming Australian actors Miles Szanto, Xavier Samuel and Tess Haubrich.

Boreham's film Teenage Kicks, starring Miles Szanto and Daniel Webber, was released in 2016. The film is about a boy, Mik, exploring sexuality, friendship, drugs, and identity after a family tragedy. When Mik's best friend Dan (played by Daniel Webber) reveals that he has a new girlfriend, this puts an end to their plans to run away together. Torn between loyalty to his migrant family and his own desires, Mik's world is rocked by a sudden death. Teenage Kicks explores themes of guilt, friendship, secrets, cultural and familial loyalty, and burgeoning sexuality.

Filmography
 Seamen (1998) Director, Producer, Writer
 Blow (2000) Director, Writer
 Pink Sheep (2003) Director, Producer, Editor
 Transient (2005) Director, Writer
 Stray (2007) Co Director with Dean Francis, Producer
 Love Bite (2008) Director, Writer, Producer
 Before The Rain - Violet (2009) Director
 Drowning (2009) Director, Writer
 William Yang - The Art Of Seduction (2010) Director
 Ostia - La Notte Finale (2010) Director, Writer
 Teenage Kicks (2016) Director, Writer
 Lonesome (2022)

References

External links
 

Year of birth missing (living people)
Living people
Australian film producers
University of Technology Sydney alumni
Australian film directors
Australian screenwriters
Australian LGBT screenwriters
LGBT film directors
21st-century Australian LGBT people